109 Prince Street at the corner of Greene Street – where it is #119 – in the SoHo neighborhood of Manhattan, New York City is a historic cast-iron building.  It was built in 1882-83 and was designed by Jarvis Morgan Slade in the French Renaissance style.  The cast-iron facade was provided by the architectural iron works firm of Cheney & Hewlett.

The building, originally a store, has been described as one of the most striking gems of the 19th century cast iron architecture in the world. Completely restored in 1993 by architecture firm Kapell & Kostow, it was awarded the prestigious Landmark Certificate of Merit by the New York City Landmarks Preservation Commission in 1994. It is located within the SoHo - Cast Iron Historic District.

References
Notes

External links 

 NYC Architecture | 109 Prince Street

Cast-iron architecture in New York City
New York City Designated Landmarks in Manhattan
SoHo, Manhattan
Commercial buildings completed in 1883